Beach Road Historic District is a national historic district located at Southampton in Suffolk County, New York. The district has nine contributing buildings.  They are large mansions that are centerpieces of their individual estates. Each mansion is in a different architectural style popular in the early 20th century.  They were originally built as summer estates by some of America's most prominent and wealthy families, including the Mellons, Duponts, and Ladds.

It was added to the National Register of Historic Places in 1986.

See also
North Main Street Historic District
Southampton Village Historic District
Wickapogue Road Historic District

References

Historic districts in Suffolk County, New York
Southampton (village), New York
Historic districts on the National Register of Historic Places in New York (state)
National Register of Historic Places in Suffolk County, New York